Ana María Ramírez (born 28 August 1948) is a Peruvian volleyball player. She competed in the women's tournament at the 1968 Summer Olympics.

References

External links
 

1948 births
Living people
Peruvian women's volleyball players
Olympic volleyball players of Peru
Volleyball players at the 1968 Summer Olympics
People from Piura
Pan American Games medalists in volleyball
Pan American Games silver medalists for Peru
Medalists at the 1967 Pan American Games
Medalists at the 1971 Pan American Games
Medalists at the 1975 Pan American Games
20th-century Peruvian women